At least three warships of Japan have borne the name Maya:

 , was a  launched in 1886 and struck in 1911
 , was a  launched in 1930 and sunk in 1944
 , is a  launched in 2018

Japanese Navy ship names
Imperial Japanese Navy ship names